Cerrado Pé de Gigante Area of Relevant Ecological Interest is an area of relevant ecological interest, a sustainable use protected area, in the state of São Paulo, Brazil. It preserves a sample of Cerrado vegetation.

History

The Area of relevant ecological interest (ARIE) was at one time part of the property of the Vassununga Sugar Mill, which went bankrupt in the late 1960s.
Four plots covered in seasonal forest and one, Pé-de-Gigante, covered in Cerrado vegetation became the property of the state.
On 26 October 1970 these five plots became the Vassununga State Park, the responsibility of the São Paulo State Forestry Institute.
On 3 December 1971 another portion of land covered in seasonal forest was added to the Vassununga State Park, while the Pé-de-Gigante was assigned to the University of São Paulo (USP) Institute of Biosciences, and became the Mangaíba Biological Station. There followed more than two decades of legal disputes between the USP and the Forestry Institute.

The Cerrado Pé de Gigante Area of Relevant Ecological Interest was created by decree 99.275 on 6 June 1990, and is administered at the federal level by the Chico Mendes Institute for Biodiversity Conservation (ICMBio).
In 1995 it was agreed that the ARIE would be jointly managed by the USP Biosciences Institute and the Forestry Institute.
Under an agreement of 3 July 1997 the ARIE became a part of Vassununga State Park.
It is classed as IUCN protected area category IV (habitat/species management area), with the objective of maintaining natural ecosystems of regional or local importance and regulating permissible use of these areas to make it compatible with the objectives of conserving nature.

Location

It is in the municipality of Santa Rita do Passa Quatro in the state of São Paulo.
It is not far from the Buriti de Vassununga Area of Relevant Ecological Interest, which was also created on 6 June 1990.
The terrain is gently rolling.
The climate is "Central Brazil Tropical" or "Subtropical Savannah."
Average annual temperature is below , higher in the summer.

Environment

The surrounding region is mainly covered in cerrado, with areas of semi-deciduous forest.
From the end of the 19th century human activity has made major changes, removing timber and introducing coffee plantations.
The protected area holds various types of cerrado vegetation including savannah, semi-deciduous and riparian forest, mostly in relatively good condition.
The ARIE is home to mid-sized animals such as capybaras, deer and peccaries, as well as several rare or endangered species including the maned wolf (Chrysocyon brachyurus), cougar (Felis concolor), Tayra (Eira barbara) and giant anteater (Myrmecophaga tridactyla).

Notes

Sources

1990 establishments in Brazil
Areas of relevant ecological interest of Brazil
Protected areas of São Paulo (state)
Cerrado